The 1997 UEFA Super Cup was a two-legged football match played on 8 January 1998 and 11 March 1998 between Borussia Dortmund of Germany, winner of the 1996–97 UEFA Champions League, and Barcelona of Spain, winner of the 1996–97 UEFA Cup Winners' Cup. Barcelona won the match 3–1 on aggregate, beating Borussia Dortmund 2–0 at Camp Nou in the first leg and drawing the second leg 1–1 in Westfalenstadion, Dortmund.

This was the last Super Cup played over two legs. Since 1998, it has been played as a single match at a neutral venue.

Match

Details

First leg

Second leg

See also
1996–97 UEFA Champions League
1996–97 UEFA Cup Winners' Cup
Borussia Dortmund in European football
FC Barcelona in international football competitions

References

External links
1997 UEFA Super Cup at Rec.Sport.Soccer Statistics Foundation

1997–98 in European football
1997
FC Barcelona matches
Borussia Dortmund matches
1997
1997
1997–98 in Spanish football
1997–98 in German football
January 1998 sports events in Europe
Sports competitions in Dortmund
20th century in Dortmund
Sports competitions in Barcelona
1990s in Barcelona
1997 in Catalan sport
1990s in North Rhine-Westphalia